Nacim El Hassani (born 16 March 2000) is a French professional footballer who plays as a midfielder for Niort.

Career
El Hassani is a product of the youth academy of Monclar, Avignon and Nîmes, beginning his career with their reserves in 2018. He had a short stint with Stade Beaucairois where he made his senior debut, returning to Avignon for a season before moving to SC Courthézon in 2021. In January 2022 he transferred to the reserves of Niort, and made his professional debut with Niort in a 1–0 Ligue 2 loss to AC Ajaccio on 22 March 2022. He was promoted to their senior team and signied a professional contract for 2 years on 5 May 2022.

References

External links
 
 

2000 births
Living people
Sportspeople from Avignon
French footballers
French sportspeople of Moroccan descent
Nîmes Olympique players
Stade Beaucairois players
AC Avignonnais players
Chamois Niortais F.C. players
Ligue 2 players
Championnat National players
Championnat National 3 players
Association football midfielders